List of observers to the European Parliament may refer to:

 List of observers to the European Parliament for East Germany, 1991–1994
 List of observers to the European Parliament for Estonia, 2003–2004
 List of observers to the European Parliament for Slovakia, 2003–2004
 List of observers to the European Parliament for Hungary, 2003–2004
 List of observers to the European Parliament for Slovenia, 2003–2004
 List of observers to the European Parliament for Latvia, 2003–2004
 List of observers to the European Parliament for Cyprus, 2003–2004
 List of observers to the European Parliament for Malta, 2003–2004
 List of observers to the European Parliament for Lithuania, 2003–2004
 List of observers to the European Parliament for Poland, 2003–2004
 List of observers to the European Parliament for the Czech Republic, 2003–2004
 List of observers to the European Parliament for Bulgaria, 2005–2006
 List of observers to the European Parliament for Romania, 2005–2006
 List of observers to the European Parliament for Croatia, 2012–2013